Josef Kolmaš (6 August 1933, Těmice – 9 February 2021) was a leading Czech sinologist and tibetologist.

Career
He was a translator and world-renowned expert on the history of Sino-Tibetan relations, a long-time researcher at the Oriental Institute of the Czechoslovak Academy of Sciences and the Academy of Sciences of the Czech Republic, and its director from 1994 to 2002.

Works
Tibet and Imperial China: A Survey of Sino-Tibetan Relations Up to the End of the Manchu Dynasty in 1912 1967
Iconography of the Derge Kanjur and Tanjur 1978 
Buddhistická svatá písma1995 
Vzpomínka na Tibet 1997 
Suma tibetského písemnictví 2004 
Tibet: Dějiny a duchovní kultura 2004 
Klasické tibetské příběhy: Mysterium o životě a zmrtvýchvstání krásné paní Nangsy. O ptácích a opicích. Zrcadlo králů 2009 
Malá encyklopedie tibetského náboženství a mytologie 2009 
Slovník tibetské literatury 2010 
Tibet 2011 
Země na střeše světa: Z dějin poznávání Tibetu 2011 
Pojednání o věcech tibetských 2014 
Pojednání o věcech čínských 2015

References

1933 births
2021 deaths
Czech sinologists
People from Hodonín District
Place of death missing